The Florida Complex League Tigers are a Rookie-level affiliate of the Detroit Tigers, competing in the Florida Complex League of Minor League Baseball. Prior to 2021, the team was known as the Gulf Coast League Tigers. The team plays its home games at Joker Marchant Stadium in Lakeland, Florida. The team is composed mainly of players who are in their first year of professional baseball either as draftees or non-drafted free agents from the United States, Canada, Dominican Republic, Venezuela, and various other countries.

History
The team first played in the Gulf Coast League (GCL) during the 1968 season. After then being absent for over 25 years, the team returned to the league in 1995 and has competed continuously since then.

Starting with the 2016 season, the team has fielded two squads in the league, differentiated with "East" and "West" suffixes. The second team was created due to the cancellation of the Venezuelan Summer League, which left the Tigers with a roster full of players with no team. Most of these players were assigned to one of the two GCL squads, although some were assigned to the Tigers affiliate in the Dominican Summer League.

Prior to the 2021 season, the Gulf Coast League was renamed as the Florida Complex League (FCL).

Rosters

Season-by-season

GCL Tigers East

GCL Tigers West

References

External links
 Official website (East)
 Official website (West)

Tigers
Detroit Tigers minor league affiliates
Tigers
Sports in Lakeland, Florida
Baseball teams established in 1968
1968 establishments in Florida